Clemens Kapuuo (16 March 1923 – 27 March 1978) was a Namibian school teacher, shopkeeper, president of the Democratic Turnhalle Alliance (DTA), now called Popular Democratic Movement (PDM), and chief of the Herero people of Namibia. Kapuuo was one of the leading opponents of South African rule of his country until his assassination following the Turnhalle Constitutional Conference.

Biography
Clemens Kapuuo was born in 1923 at Ozondjona za Ndjamo (Teufelsbach), in the Okahandja District north of Windhoek and attended school at Okahandja in 1931. In 1937 he went to St Barnabas Anglican Church School in Windhoek's Old Location. He qualified as a teacher at Viljoensdrif and at the Stoffberg Training College, both in the Orange Free State. Kapuuo was related to Samuel Maherero and was also the blood nephew of the first Namibian nationalist leader, Hosea Kutako.

From 1944 to 1945 he taught at primary schools in Waterberg and Karibib, and in 1946 transferred to St Barnabas where he taught English. From 1950-1953 he was president of the South West African Coloured Teachers’ Association (SWACTA).

He was a member of the founding committee of the South West Africa National Union (SWANU) in 1958. He resigned as a teacher in 1960 when he was appointed deputy chief to Hosea Kutako. The Herero chiefs council also appointed him as the automatic successor to Hosea Kutako, who was then old, as they feared that the South African authorities would try to take advantage of the death of Kutako to impose their own nominee as chief. Kapuuo was also a shopkeeper in the Old Location in Windhoek, and led the opposition to the removal of black people from the Old Location to Katutura in the 1960s.

In 1964 the Herero Chiefs Council withdrew from SWANU, which it had helped to found, and established the National Unity Democratic Organisation (NUDO), so that the council as such would not have to be directly involved in politics. The founding leader was Mburumba Kerina, who had been a founding member of both SWANU and SWAPO, but after disagreements with the chiefs council Kerina was replaced by Kapuuo.

Following the decision of the International Court of Justice at the Hague in 1971 that South African rule in Namibia was illegal, Kapuuo, as the leader of NUDO was instrumental in forming the National Convention. The National Convention included SWAPO under David Meroro, SWANU under Gerson Veii and several other political groups, and demanded an immediate take-over of Namibia by the United Nations in preparation for independence. In 1973, however, the United Nations declared SWAPO the sole authentic representative of the people of Namibia, and this soured relations between NUDO and SWAPO. Kapuuo objected on the grounds that the Ovambo (who made up the majority of members of SWAPO) had not been dispossessed of their land under German and South African rule as the Hereros had, and were therefore relatively privileged newcomers to the country's independence movement.

In 1974 the National Convention broke up and Kapuuo participated in the Turnhalle negotiations, as a result of which NUDO joined the Democratic Turnhalle Alliance. Kapuuo was assassinated by
an unknown assailant in 1978.

Death
Kapuuo was assassinated by two gunmen in the black township of Katutura on 27 March 1978, with both SWAPO and the South African authorities blaming each other.

At his death he was described by the media as a "popular moderate and leader of the multiracial Democratic Turnhalle Alliance".

Kapuuo is buried alongside Hosea Kutako in the traditionally Herero town of Okahandja. Over 10,000 members of the Herero tribe attended his burial, despite fears that the cemetery was mined. In 1999, Herero Paramount Chief Kuaima Riruako urged the Truth and Reconciliation Commission of South Africa to investigate Kapuuo's death as they had done with killed SWAPO activist Anton Lubowski.

References

Bibliography
 
 

1923 births
1978 deaths
Assassinated Namibian politicians
Male murder victims
Popular Democratic Movement politicians
SWANU politicians
National Unity Democratic Organisation politicians
People murdered in Namibia
Deaths by firearm in Namibia
Herero people
Namibian schoolteachers
People from Okahandja
20th-century Namibian politicians